The 1920 Campeonato Paulista, organized by the APEA (Associação Paulista de Esportes Atléticos), was the 19th season of São Paulo's top association football league. Palestra Itália won the title for the 1st time. the top scorer was Corinthians's Neco with 24 goals.

System
The championship was disputed in a double-round robin system, with the team with the most points winning the title.

Championship

Playoffs

References

Campeonato Paulista seasons
Paulista